The 34th Ariel Awards ceremony, organized by the Mexican Academy of Film Arts and Sciences (AMACC) took place on April 27, 1992, in Mexico City. During the ceremony, AMACC presented the Ariel Award in 20 categories honoring films released in 1991. Como Agua Para Chocolate received ten awards out of 14 nominations, including Best Picture and Best Director for Alfonso Arau. La Mujer de Benjamín followed with six awards; and El Bulto, Objetos Perdidos, Perdón...Investidura (1950-1954), Playa Azul, Sólo Con Tu Pareja and Travesía de la Obsesión (Expedición al Himalaya) with one.

Winners and nominees
Winners are listed first and highlighted with boldface.

Special awards
Golden Ariel – Ricardo Saldivar

Multiple nominations and awards

The following seven films received multiple nominations:

Films that received multiple awards:

References

Ariel Awards ceremonies
1992 film awards
1992 in Mexico